Hilda Nilsson (24 May 1876 – 10 August 1917) was a Swedish serial killer from Helsingborg who became known as "the angel maker on Bruks Street". She is one of Sweden's most notorious female serial killers.

In 1917, she was imprisoned for murdering eight children. Her trial, which included a mental examination, began on 2 June 1917. At the conclusion of the trial on 15 June 1917, she was sentenced to death. She escaped execution punishment by committing suicide while in jail in Landskrona. She hanged herself with a linen cloth, which she had tied to a cell door, and was thus the last person sentenced to death in Sweden not to have the sentence commuted.

Background 
Hilda Nilsson and her husband Gustaf lived in Helsingborg. The couple had accrued large debts and needed a way to pay their bills.

As a way to raise cash, Nilsson cared for infants in return for money from unmarried mothers who needed help. At that time, having a child outside of marriage was a shameful moral crime, and caring for these children for a fee (known as baby farming) was a common practice.

Nilsson kept her home in a good, clean condition, which made mothers more willing to leave their unwanted children in her care.  However, the small sums of money she received was far from what she needed to support all the children she had agreed to look after.

Murders 

Nilsson murdered the children she took care of shortly after their mothers left them in her care. This was possible because the authorities rarely knew of these babies' existence. Furthermore, the mothers almost never wanted to come back to learn how their children were doing.

One method Nilsson used for murdering the children was to put them into a washtub and then place heavy objects—such as a washboard and coal scuttle—on top of them. She then left the room and returned hours later when the children were dead. The next step in her procedure was to burn their bodies. On occasions when she did not burn them, she dug graves and buried them.

Nilsson was different from other baby-farmer child killers of that time, in that she actively killed the children. Most others simply left the children with insufficient food and in unhealthy living conditions, which led to their death.

Discovery, trial and sentence 
Nilsson's crimes were discovered when a woman named Blenda Henricsson wanted to contact her child. When Nilsson refused contact, Henricsson asked the police to investigate. The police soon found ample incriminating evidence of the murders.

Nilsson was sentenced to death by guillotine for eight murders. Before the punishment could be carried out, she committed suicide by hanging on 10 August 1917.

She was the last death penalty prisoner in Swedish history whose sentence was not commuted.

See also 
List of serial killers by country

Notes

References

External links 

1867 births
1917 suicides
Swedish female serial killers
Female suicides
People convicted of murder by Sweden
People from Helsingborg
Prisoners who died in Swedish detention
Serial killers who committed suicide in prison custody
Swedish female murderers
Swedish murderers of children
Swedish people convicted of murder
Swedish people who died in prison custody
Swedish serial killers
Suicides by hanging in Sweden
Baby farming